Hem Bahadur Gurung was the 20th IGP of Nepal. On September 14, 2008, he was appointed Inspector General of Nepal Police, the highest police rank of Nepal Police. He was preceded by Om Bikram Rana and was succeeded by Ramesh Chand Thakuri as the police chief. His term had begun on September 18, 2008, and had ended in February 2009.

He was sentenced to one year in prison for corruption by the Supreme Court on 2017 for his role in the Armoured Police Carrier Carrier scam.

References

Living people
Year of birth missing (living people)
Nepalese police officers
Chiefs of police
Inspectors General of Police (Nepal)